Moores Creek is a  long 1st order tributary to Reedy Fork in Guilford County, North Carolina.

Course
Moores Creek rises in a pond about 1 mile north of Piedmont-Triad International Airport in Guilford County on the divide between Moores Creek and Brush Creek.  Moores Creek then flows northeast to meet the Haw River about 1.5 miles south of Summerfield, North Carolina.

Watershed
Moores Creek drains  of area, receives about 44.9 in/year of precipitation, has a topographic wetness index of 396.37 and is about 47% forested.

References

Rivers of North Carolina
Rivers of Guilford County, North Carolina